Darren Horrigan (born 2 June 1983) is an English footballer who played in the Football League for Lincoln City. A goalkeeper born in Middlesbrough, Horrigan began his career with Birmingham City, and went on to play non-League football for clubs including Stamford Town, Cambridge City, Ilkeston Town, Spennymoor United, Scarborough, Gateshead, Bishop Auckland and Tow Law Town.

References
Infobox statistics
 Lincoln City, Scarborough: 
 Cambridge City: 
 Gateshead: 
 Bishop Auckland: 
General

1983 births
Living people
Footballers from Middlesbrough
English footballers
Association football goalkeepers
Birmingham City F.C. players
Lincoln City F.C. players
Stamford A.F.C. players
Cambridge City F.C. players
Ilkeston Town F.C. (1945) players
Spennymoor United F.C. players
Scarborough F.C. players
Gateshead F.C. players
Bishop Auckland F.C. players
Tow Law Town F.C. players
English Football League players
Southern Football League players
National League (English football) players
Northern Premier League players
Northern Football League players